2017 SC Sagamihara season.

J3 League

References

External links
 J.League official site

SC Sagamihara
SC Sagamihara seasons